Bardou, France may refer to:

 Bardou, Dordogne, commune in the Dordogne, France
 Bardou, Hérault, village in the Hérault, France